Metasia bilineatella is a moth in the family Crambidae. It was described by Inoue in 1996. It is found in Japan, where it has been recorded from Ogasawara Islands.

References

Moths described in 1996
Metasia